Evan King and Julian Lenz were the defending champions but only King chose to defend his title, partnering Jan Zieliński. King lost in the first round to Franco Agamenone and Omar Giacalone.

Tomás Martín Etcheverry and Renzo Olivo won the title after defeating Luis David Martínez and David Vega Hernández 3–6, 6–3, [10–8] in the final.

Seeds

Draw

References

 Main draw

Biella Challenger VII - Doubles